Manuel Dorrego (11 June 1787 – 13 December 1828) was an Argentine statesman and soldier. He was governor of Buenos Aires in 1820, and then again from 1827 to 1828.

Life and politics
Dorrego was born in Buenos Aires on 11 June 1787 to José Antonio do Rego, a Portuguese merchant, and to María de la Ascensión Salas. He enrolled in the Real Colegio de San Carlos in 1803, and moved to the Real Universidad de San Felipe in the Captaincy General of Chile to continue his studies. He supported the early steps of the Chilean War of Independence in 1810, which led to the removal of the Spanish colonial authorities and the establishment of the first Chilean Government Junta.

He moved to the United Provinces of the Río de la Plata (modern Argentina), and joined the Army of the North, under the command of Manuel Belgrano. He fought in the battles of Tucumán and Salta, being injured in both. He was sanctioned by Belgrano for promoting a duel. As a result, he did not take part in the battles of Vilcapugio and Ayohuma, two defeats of the Army of the North, and Belgrano regretted later the absence of Dorrego from them.

Dorrego opposed the Luso-Brazilian invasion of the Banda Oriental, encouraged by Juan Martín de Pueyrredón to counter the influence of José Gervasio Artigas. He was exiled by Pueyrredón, and stayed some time in Baltimore (United States). He studied federalism in the United States, and thought that each state of a country should have some autonomy, rejecting the strong centralization into a single government sought by Pueyrredón. During this times he wrote the Cartas apologéticas, criticizing the support of Pueyrredón to the Luso-Brazilian invasion.

He returned to Buenos Aires in 1819, following the departure of Pueyrredón. He was appointed as interim governor, and fought against the armies of Alvear, Carrera and Estanislao López. Still, he was resisted in the city, and the stable appointment as governor was given to Martín Rodríguez instead. He was banished again, and moved to Upper Peru. He met Simón Bolívar in Quito, and supported his ideas of unifying all the continent into a giant federation.

Dorrego returned to Buenos Aires a short time afterwards and worked in the legislature of Buenos Aires in the 1826 Constituent Assembly. He strongly supported a federal system of government and criticized the qualified suffrage. However, the 1826 Constitution promoted a strong centralized government and qualified suffrage. 

Dorrego opposed the government of the unitarian Bernardino Rivadavia, who was appointed as the first president of Argentina, and voiced his criticism in the newspaper "El Tribuno". Resisted by all the provinces, Rivadavia resigned as president, and vice president Vicente López y Planes resigned as well. No longer having a national head of state, the legislature appointed Dorrego as governor of the Buenos Aires province. He took measures to support the poor, promote a federal organization of the country, and ended the Argentine–Brazilian War.

The Argentine troops were discontented with Dorrego because he accepted the conditions imposed by the British diplomacy despite their military victories in the conflict. Encouraged by the Unitarian party, Juan Lavalle led a coup against Dorrego on 1 December 1828. Dorrego left the city and organized his forces in the countryside. He was defeated, and then executed by Lavalle. Lavalle closed the legislature and began a period of political violence against the Federals, but he was defeated and forced to resign by Juan Manuel de Rosas, who restored the institutions that existed before Lavalle's coup.

See also
Argentine Civil War
Manuel Dorrego national institute

References

Bibliography
 

1787 births
1828 deaths
Leaders ousted by a coup
Governors of Buenos Aires Province
Executed politicians
Foreign ministers of Argentina
Argentine military personnel killed in the Argentine Civil War
People from Buenos Aires
People of the Argentine War of Independence
People executed by Argentina by firing squad
Argentine people of Portuguese descent
Extrajudicial killings
Federales (Argentina)
Burials at La Recoleta Cemetery